The fourth season of the television comedy series Boy Meets World aired between September 20, 1996 and May 9, 1997, on ABC in the United States. The season was produced by Michael Jacobs Productions and Touchstone Television with series creator Michael Jacobs as executive producer. It was broadcast as part of the ABC comedy block TGIF on Friday evenings.

Cast 

Ben Savage as Cory Matthews
William Daniels as George Feeny 
Betsy Randle as Amy Matthews 
Will Friedle as Eric Matthews 
Rider Strong as Shawn Hunter
Danielle Fishel as Topanga Lawrence 
Anthony Tyler Quinn as Jonathan Turner
Lindsay Ridgeway as Morgan Matthews 
William Russ as Alan Matthews

Episodes

Notes

References

External links
 

1996 American television seasons
1997 American television seasons
4